In the run-up to the 2021 German federal election, various organisations carried out opinion polling to gauge voting intentions in Germany. Results of such polls are displayed in this list.

The date range for these opinion polls are from the previous federal election, held on 24 September 2017, to the election which was held on 26 September 2021.

Graphical summary 
Civey (SPON-Wahltrend) published daily data since 1 October 2017; however, its daily results are not accounted for in the trendlines below, and not included in the table below (except if an article on the figures is published in Spiegel Online), given notable methodological differences.

Poll results

2021

2020

2019

2018

2017

CDU and CSU

By state

Baden-Württemberg

Bavaria

Berlin

Brandenburg

Hamburg

Hesse

Mecklenburg-Vorpommern

Lower Saxony

North Rhine-Westphalia

Rhineland-Palatinate

Saxony

Thuringia

Chancellor candidates

Preferred coalition

Constituency projections

See also 
Opinion polling for the next German federal election
Opinion polling for the 2017 German federal election
Opinion polling for the 2013 German federal election

External links 
Wahlrecht.de 
pollytix-Wahltrend 
DAWUM Wahltrend 
Twitter: @Wahlen_DE 

Next